is a railway station of the Chūō Main Line, East Japan Railway Company (JR East) in Nakata-Nakajō, Nirasaki City, Yamanashi Prefecture, Japan.

Lines
Shinpu Station is served by the Chūō Main Line, and is 151.2 kilometers from the terminus of the line at Tokyo Station.

Station layout
The station consists of two opposed side platforms built on an embankment. There is no station building and the station is unattended.

Platforms

History
Shimpu Station opened on June 10, 1945 as a signal stop, and was elevated to a full station on September 10, 1972 as a station on the JNR (Japanese National Railways). With the dissolution and privatization of the JNR on April 1, 1987, the station came under the control of the East Japan Railway Company.

Passenger statistics
In fiscal 2010, the station was used by an average of 68 passengers daily (boarding passengers only).

Surrounding area
Kamanashi River
Japan National Route 20
 site of Shinpu Castle

See also
 List of railway stations in Japan

References

 Miyoshi Kozo. Chuo-sen Machi to eki Hyaku-niju nen. JT Publishing (2009)

External links

JR East Shimpu Station

Railway stations in Yamanashi Prefecture
Railway stations in Japan opened in 1972
Chūō Main Line
Stations of East Japan Railway Company
Nirasaki, Yamanashi